Dr. Sixgun is an American Western radio drama that aired on NBC, September 2, 1954 – October 13, 1955.

Plot summary
Dr. Ray Matson, (Karl Weber)  is a frontier physician based in a small western town in the 1870s called Frenchman's Ford. The stories are told by a recurring character named Pablo (Bill Griffis), a gypsy peddler who has a talking raven named Midnight as his sidekick. As his name implied, Matson was equally at home with using a gun or using his medical skills to solve problems.

Broadcast history
Dr. Sixgun was broadcast September 2, 1954 – October 13, 1955, on NBC. The 30-minute sustaining series aired Thursdays at 8:30 pm, September 2–October 21, 1954; Sundays at 8 pm, October 10, 1954 – April 21, 1955; and Thursdays at 8 pm, August 18–October 13, 1955.

Preservation status
More than 25 episodes are known to survive in radio collections.

References

External links
Dr. Sixgun at the Internet Archive
Dr. Sixgun at Jerry Haendiges Vintage Radio Logs

American radio dramas
1954 radio programme debuts
1955 radio programme endings
1950s American radio programs
NBC radio programs
Fictional physicians
Western (genre) radio series
Period radio series